Herman Dahl (born 24 November 1993) is a Norwegian racing cyclist, who currently rides for UCI Continental team . He competed in the men's team time trial event at the 2017 UCI Road World Championships.

Major results
2016
 5th Road race, National Road Championships
 8th Gooikse Pijl
2017
 1st  Overall Baltic Chain Tour
1st Stages 3 & 4
 6th Fyen Rundt
2018
 1st GP Horsens
 2nd Omloop Mandel-Leie-Schelde
 6th Overall Tour de Bretagne
1st Stage 1
 6th Fyen Rundt
2019
 1st Stage 3 Tour of Rhodes
 4th International Rhodes Grand Prix
 6th Gooikse Pijl

References

External links

1993 births
Living people
Norwegian male cyclists
Sportspeople from Kristiansand